Griffith House, or Wright House, is a historic home located at Aberdeen, Harford County, Maryland, United States. The house is reflective of the type of dwelling of a moderately successful 18th-century farmer or planter.

Griffith House was listed on the National Register of Historic Places in 1978.

References

External links
, including undated photo, Maryland Historical Trust

Houses on the National Register of Historic Places in Maryland
Houses in Harford County, Maryland
Aberdeen, Maryland
National Register of Historic Places in Harford County, Maryland